Dartitis is a condition which can affect darts players, and severely damage their performance. It can be compared to 'the yips', an expression used to describe apparent loss of fine motor skills without any explanation. The term is used in reference to players who struggle with some kind of psychological problem with their technique and/or release of their darts.

Etymology
Dartitis is a portmanteau of the sport's name and "-itis", a suffix that relates to a medical condition. It is described by the Collins English Dictionary as "(in darts) nervous twitching or tension that destroys concentration and spoils performance". The word was first used in the magazine Darts World by editor Tony Wood in 1981.

Cases
In 1986 five-times World Champion, Eric Bristow revealed he had the condition because he was having problems with the release of his darts. Bristow managed to make a partial recovery from the condition, and even managed to regain the number one position in the world rankings. Former World Champion Mark Webster also had dartitis. In the 2017 Grand Slam of Darts, Berry van Peer suffered from dartitis. This was visible in his matches against Simon Whitlock, Gary Anderson and Cameron Menzies.

Condition
Dartitis is believed to be a form of dystonia,  which is described by the UK NHS as: 
A medical term for a range of movement disorders that cause muscle spasms and contractions. The spasms and contractions may either be sustained or may come and go. Movements are often repetitive and cause unusual, awkward and sometimes painful postures. Tremor (shaking) can also be a characteristic of some types of dystonia. Dystonia is thought to be a neurological condition (caused by underlying problems with the brain and nervous system). However, in most cases, brain functions such as intelligence, memory and language remain unaffected.

References

Darts terminology